Kondrud and Gundrud and Kandrud or Kond Rud, also rendered as Kondo Rud, may refer to:
 Kond Rud, Shabestar, East Azerbaijan Province
 Kond Rud, Tabriz, East Azerbaijan Province
 Kondrud, Qom